The Sterling Warriors football program is a college football team that represents Sterling College (Kansas) in the Kansas Collegiate Athletic Conference, a part of the NAIA.  The team has had 34 head coaches since its first recorded football game in 1893. The current head coach is Chase Hansen, who took over for Chuck Lambert after the 2017 season. Lambert was the successor of his brother and former head coachAndy Lambert

Key

Coaches
Statistics correct as of the end of the 2021 college football season.

See also

 Lists of people from Kansas

Notes

References

Lists of college football head coaches

Kansas sports-related lists